Holbeach St Johns is a small village in South Holland district of Lincolnshire, England.

The Greenwich Meridian runs through Holbeach St Johns.

External links

Villages in Lincolnshire
Holbeach